Daniela Galeotti (born 22 March 1977 in Livorno) is an Italian high jumper.

Biography
She was 5th at 2003 Military World Games.

National titles
Daniela Galeotti has won 3 times the individual national championship.
1 win in High jump (1999)
2 wins in High jump indoor (1999, 2001)

References

External links
 

1977 births
Italian female high jumpers
Living people